Lieutenant general (Retd) Ajai Singh PVSM, AVSM (born 20 November 1934) was the Governor of Assam state in India, from 2003 to 2008. He is also the chairman of the North Eastern Council (NEC).

Early life and career 
Born on 20 November 1934 in a farmer's family in Rajasthan he studied at Mayo College Ajmer  and Madras University.

After studies, he joined the Indian Army and was commissioned into the Poona Horse. He saw action in the Indo-Pakistani wars of 1965 and 1971.

Training
He has attended Tank Commanders Course in Czechoslovakia in the year 1966, Defense Services Staff Course in Wellington in 1972, Higher Command Course at College of Combat at Mhow during 1979–80, Royal College of Defence Studies in London (UK) in 1983, and Discussions at RAND Co-operation in the USA in 1983 & 1989.

Commands held
Commander Independent Armed Brigade, Ambala from 1980 to '82
BGS I-Corps, Mathura from 1982 to '84
Director General, WE, Army Headquarters, New Delhi from the year 1985 to '87
GOC, 31 Armoured Division, Jhansi from the year 1987 to '89
Director General, Mechanized Forces, Army HQ, New Delhi from 1989 to '90
General Officer Commanding – 4 Corps, Tezpur, Assam from 1990 to '92
Director General, Combat Vehicles, Army HQ New Delhi from 1992 to '93, CCR&D, Defence Research & Development Organisation from 1993 to '95 (Ministry of Defence, Government of India).

Honours
Indian Military Academy (IMA) Sword of Honor and silver medal. (Best All Round Gentleman Cadet of June 1956 Batch)
Mentioned in Despatches for Gallantry (1965 Indo – Pak War)
Ati Vishist Seva Medal for Gallantry – (1986) 
Param Vishist Seva Medal for Gallantry – (1992)

References

External links 
 Profile: Governor of Assam

Indian generals
Governors of Assam
Rajasthani people
1934 births
Mayo College alumni
Military personnel from Rajasthan
Living people
Recipients of the Param Vishisht Seva Medal
Army War College, Mhow alumni
Defence Services Staff College alumni
Graduates of the Royal College of Defence Studies